Birds of North America was an American documentary series produced by Topic and distributed by YouTube. It was directed by Rob Meyer and hosted by naturalist and birdwatcher Jason Ward. The series, which regularly featured Jason's brother Jeffrey, was first announced on March 8, 2019 and the first episode aired on March 17, 2019. The series aimed to reach people who might not normally engage in conservation efforts and learn about natural history—in particular young people, people of color, and people who live in cities. People and projects featured in the series include: the American Museum of Natural History's collection manager Paul Sweet, veteran birder Pete Dunne, author and ecology professor Drew Lanham, New York City-based artist George Boorujy (author of the Audubon Mural Project), comedian Wyatt Cenac, and Molly Adams (founder of the Feminist Bird Club).

In February 2021, following allegations of sexual misconduct involving the host of the series, Topic removed the series from all their platforms.

References 

Education-related YouTube channels
2010s American documentary television series
Birdwatching
Films about birds